Bresciadue (BS2) is a station of the Brescia Metro, in the city of Brescia in northern Italy.

The station is located in an area of new business developments and office complexes. It is near the headquarters of Telecom Italia and UBI Banca, and the Crystal Palace, one of the tallest buildings in Italy.

References

External links

Brescia Metro stations
Railway stations opened in 2013
2013 establishments in Italy
Railway stations in Italy opened in the 21st century